Eoin Carey (born 2000) is an Irish hurler who plays for Cork Championship club Kilworth and at inter-county level with the Cork senior hurling team. He usually lines out as a midfielder.

Honours

Cork
All-Ireland Under-20 Hurling Championship (1): 2020
Munster Under-20 Hurling Championship (1): 2020
All-Ireland Under-17 Hurling Championship (1): 2017
Munster Under-17 Hurling Championship (1): 2017

References

2000 births
Living people
Kilworth hurlers
Cork inter-county hurlers